Godrej Industries Limited is a holding company of the Godrej Group. The company has its headquarters in Mumbai, India.

Division
Godrej Industries has the following divisions;
 Godrej Chemicals
 Godrej Agrovet
Godrej Consumer Products
Godrej Properties

References

Companies based in Mumbai
Chemical companies of India
Indian companies established in 1963
Godrej Group
1963 establishments in Maharashtra
Chemical companies established in 1963
Companies listed on the National Stock Exchange of India
Companies listed on the Bombay Stock Exchange